The Hastings Cutoff was an alternative route for westward emigrants to travel to California, as proposed by Lansford Hastings in The Emigrant's Guide to Oregon and California. The ill-fated Donner Party infamously took the route in 1846.

Description
A sentence in Hastings' guidebook briefly describes the cutoff:

The most direct route, for the California emigrants, would be to leave the Oregon route, about two hundred miles east from Fort Hall; thence bearing West Southwest, to the Salt Lake; and thence continuing down to the bay of St. Francisco, by the route just described.

The cutoff left the Oregon Trail at Fort Bridger in Wyoming, passed through the Wasatch Range, across the Great Salt Lake Desert, an 80-mile nearly water-less drive, looped around the Ruby Mountains, and rejoined the California Trail about seven miles west of modern Elko (also Emigrant Pass).

The west end of the cutoff is marked as Nevada Historical Marker 3.

Trail use
Hastings led a small party overland late in 1845 and spent the winter in California. Significantly, his stay at Sutter's Fort coincided with a visit by John C. Frémont, who had just explored the Great Salt Lake Desert and whose letter describing a new route to California would be widely published in Eastern newspapers. In April, Hastings set out with a few companions to meet the emigration of 1847. He stayed in the vicinity of the Sweetwater River while an eastbound traveler carried his open letter inviting emigrants on the California Trail to meet him at Fort Bridger. Between 60 and 75 wagons did so and traveled with Hastings on his cutoff.  They endured a difficult descent down Weber Canyon, a waterless drive of 80 miles across the Great Salt Lake Desert, and a lengthy detour around the Ruby Mountains. Despite the usual trials of overland travel, they arrived safely in California.

The Donner Party, following in the wake of this initial party in 1846, had an unsuccessful experience with the Hastings Cutoff. They had arrived about a week early to travel with Hastings' party, and on his suggestion pioneered an alternate route to avoid Weber Canyon. The roadbuilding required through the Wasatch Mountains and the grueling Great Salt Lake Desert delayed them. When they had arrived at the California Trail, they were delayed about a month. The party arrived at Donner Pass just as an early winter storm rendered it impassable. After becoming snowbound in the Sierra Nevada, many died of starvation, and some of the emigrants resorted to eating their animals and the deceased members of the group.

In July 1847, Mormon leader Brigham Young led a vanguard company of emigrants from Winter Quarters, in what is now Omaha, to the future site of Salt Lake City. The company chose to use the Hastings Cutoff passing through modern-day Emigration Canyon. Young's group made remarkable improvements to some parts of the cutoff on their journey so subsequent Mormon companies could more easily make it through to the Salt Lake valley. William Clayton, the company's scribe, stated in his journals that the company tried to follow the route left by the Donner Party the previous year, yet only occasionally could identify the tracks.

The California gold rush created an enormous increase in westward traffic and several parties of 1849 and 1850 used the Hastings Cutoff. The year 1850 saw the development of a new route called the Salt Lake Cutoff that avoided the Great Salt Lake Desert west of the lake.  Subsequently, the Hastings Cutoff was abandoned, except for portions east of Salt Lake City, where it remained as the end of the Mormon Trail.

See also 
Donner Party timeline

References

Citations

General references
 DeLafosse, Peter H., ed. Trailing the Pioneers: A Guide to Utah's Emigrant Trails, 1829–1869. Utah State University Press, 1994.
 Hastings, Lansford W.The Emigrants' Guide to Oregon and California. Bedford, Mass.: Applewood Books, 1994. (Facsimile of the 1845 ed.)
 Kelly, Charles. Salt Desert Trails. Hastings Cutoff Sesquicentennial ed. Edited by Peter H. DeLafosse. Salt Lake City: Western Epics, 1996.
 Korns, J. Roderic, and Dale L. Morgan, eds. West from Fort Bridger: The Pioneering of Immigrant Trails Across Utah, 1846–1850. Revised and updated by Will Bagley and Harold Schindler. Logan: Utah State University Press, 1994.
 Knight, Hal, 111 Days to Zion.  Deseret Press, 1978.
 Morgan, Dale L., Overland in 1846: Diaries and Letters of the California-Oregon Trail. Lincoln: University of Nebraska Press, 1993. 2 vols. Reprint; originally published by Talisman Press in 1963. . 
 Spedden, H. Rush., The Fearful Long Drive: The 1846 Hastings Cutoff Overland Journal, Oregon-California Trails Association, Vol. 12, No. 2, Summer 1994.
 Spedden, H. Rush., Hastings Cutoff: Bryant's Trail to Skull Valley Overland Journal, Oregon-California Trails Association, Vol. 23, No. 2, Summer 2005.
 Spedden, H. Rush., The Donner Trail Across the Salt Lake Valley Overland Journal, Oregon-California Trails Association, Vol. 26, No. 1, Summer 2008.
 Spedden, H. Rush., Lansford Hastings, Orson Pratt, Google Earth, and GPS Overland Journal, Oregon-California Trails Association, Vol. 28, No. 4, Summer 2010.
 Tea, Roy D., ed. The Hastings Cutoff: Grantsville to Donner Springs, May 1996. Salt Lake City, UT: [Utah Crossroads Chapter, Oregon-California Trails Association], 1996.
 Tea, Roy D., ed. Hastings Longtripp: A Hastings Cutoff Trail Guide from Donner Spring to the Humboldt River. Salt Lake City, UT: Utah Crossroads, Oregon-California Trails Association, 1996.
 Tea, Roy D., ed. The Hastings Cutoff: A Tragic Decision: The Weber Canyon Route. Salt Lake City, UT: Utah Crossroads, Oregon-California Trails Association, 2004.

External links 
 
 
 The Emigrants' Guide to Oregon and California by Lansford Hastings, digitized book
 Oregon-California Trails Association

California Trail
Donner Party
Historic trails and roads in Nevada
Historic trails and roads in Utah
Historic trails and roads in Wyoming
Ruby Mountains
Trails and roads in the American Old West
Wasatch Range